Park Seong-ho (born March 14, 1974) is a veteran South Korean comedian. He is best known as a comedian in KBS' Gag Concert and has participated in many variety shows. He won two Top Excellence Awards at the KBS Entertainment Awards as well as the Grand Prize in Variety at the Baeksang Arts Awards for his work in Gag Concert.

Biography and career
Park Seongho was born in Busan, South Korea. He studied western painting and graduated from Cheongju University with a bachelor's degree. He married Lee Ji-young and has a son named Park Jeong-bin and daughter.

He is part of KBS' 13th class of comedians, passing the test in 1997 and debuting on Gag Concert in 2000, making him the comedian with the highest seniority on the show. He gained fame playing the popular character, "Gyaru Sang" and other segments on Gag Concert. He was a cast member for the first season of The Human Condition and the first sport (table tennis) on Cool Kiz On the Block. He also appeared on the latter show's first anniversary episode. He was a professor at Seoul National University in 2007.

Filmography

Movies
 Champion Mabbagi (2007)- the sportscaster
 Billy and the Brave Guys 3 (2014)- voice for 한국어, 목소리

Radio
 SBS Power FM Kim Chang Ryul's Old School (2006-2007)

Live performances 
 2015 KBS Family Comedy Concert in Busan (개그패밀리 콘서트 - 부산)

TV shows

 KBS 2 Days & 1 Night Season 3 (ep 38-39)
 KBS Comedy File
 KBS Comedy Stations
 KBS Full House
 KBS Cool Kiz On The Block
 KBS Good Country Campaign Headquarters
 KBS Human Condition
 KBS Show Laughing Day Good Day
 KBS Show! Lucky Train
 KBS The Gag Concert You've Never Seen Before
 KBS Video Champion

 KBS Joy Hug Me
 MBC It's a Gag
 SBS Connect! Movie World
 SBS Global Taiyaki
 SBS Good Friends
 SBS Love Tonight
 SBS Smile People
 tvN Blue Tower
 ComedyTV Gag Survival UFG
 Channel A Now On My Way to Meet You

Gag Concert segments

2000–2006
Park Seong Ho's Music Talk (2000)
Bongsunga School (2001)
Revenge (2002)
Youth White Papers (2002)
Freeze (2004)
Gag Power (2004)
Legends of Hip Hop (2004)
Bayside Shakedown (2004)
허둥가라사대 (2004)
Never Stick (2005)
사선에서 (2005)
Third World (2005)
Professionalism (2005)
복두신권 (2006)
Interview (2006)
Karaoke Guru (2006)
호구와 울봉이 (2006)

2007–2012
같기도 (2007)
Real Men (2007)
Ad-lib News (2007)
Ad-lib Brothers (2007)
도움상회 (2008)
대포동 예술극단 (2008)
Music Gallery (2008)
Ripple Broadcasting Booth (2008)
Screwed TV (2009)
BB Entertainment (2009)
Affectionate Man's Rights Committee (2009)
Choi Hyo Jong's Eyes (2010)
Mantis Kindergarten (2011)
Handsome CSI (2011)
K-JOB Star (2012)
War on Broadcasting (2012)
School Of Mental Breakdown (2012)
King of Comedy Park Seong Ho (2012)

2013–present
Men's News (2013)
I'm a Father (2013)
Girls in the Army (2013)
The Animals (2013)
Go Jo Show (2014)
Dating Skills Test (2014)
No Big Difference (2014)
Help Me! (2014)
Owls (2015)
Tour Guides (2015)

Albums 

 아니므니다 (Animunida) (2012)
 벨보원 (2010)

Awards and nominations
 2013 Republic of Korea Culture and Entertainment Awards: Comedian Daesang
 2010 Korea Broadcasting Awards Comedians Category: Appearance Award
 2010 Baeksang Arts Awards: TV Entertainment: Best Variety Performer Award
 2010 Korea PD Awards: Comedian Award
 2009 KBS Entertainment Awards: Top Excellence Award
 2004 KBS Entertainment Awards: Top Excellence Award
 2001 Baeksang Arts Awards: Comedians Category: New Male Acting Award
 1997 KBS New Male Comedian Acting Award
 1994 Chungbuk National Art Exhibition

Endorsements

Commercials
 KTB Securities 
 LG U+ TV G 
 Lotte Foods Color Power 
 Mobilo Advertisement Model
 Netmarble Go!Go!Go! Racer

References

External links
 Park Seong-ho on Daum

1973 births
Living people
South Korean male comedians
South Korean male television actors
Gag Concert
People from Busan
Best Variety Performer Male Paeksang Arts Award (television) winners
Cheongju University alumni